Carillon is a former provincial electoral division in Manitoba, Canada.

It was established for the 1886 provincial election, and eliminated with the 1969 election.  The constituency was predominantly francophone.  Albert Prefontaine and his son Edmond represented Carillon for almost all of the period between 1903 and 1962, serving with a variety of parties.

Provincial representatives

Electoral results

References

Former provincial electoral districts of Manitoba
1886 establishments in Manitoba
1969 disestablishments in Manitoba